Cycle 2 of Canada's Next Top Model, the Canadian adaptation of Tyra Banks' America's Next Top Model, aired on Citytv from May to July 2007. The show was hosted by Jay Manuel, replacing former host Tricia Helfer, who left the series to pursue her acting career. Jeanne Beker was the only returning judge from last season, with the new judges being photographer Paul Alexander, and model Yasmin Warsame. This was the last cycle aired on Citytv before it moved to CTV.  Encore presentations aired on A-Channel, Star! and FashionTelevisionChannel. The cycle's catchphrase was "Fabulous! Fierce! Ready for the World."

The prize package for this cycle included a modeling contract with Sutherland Models, an editorial spread in Fashion magazine, and a beauty contract valued at $100,000 from Procter & Gamble.

The winner of the competition was 21-year-old Rebecca Hardy from Mannheim, Ontario.

Cast

Contestants
(Ages stated are at start of contest)

Judges
 Jay Manuel (host)
 Paul Alexander
 Jeanne Beker
 Yasmin Warsame

Other cast members
 Nolé Marin - creative director
 Stacey McKenzie - runway coach

Episodes

Results

 The contestant was eliminated
 The contestant was a part of a non-elimination bottom two
 The contestant won the competition

Average call-out order
Casting call-out order and final episode are not included.

Bottom two

 The contestant was eliminated after her first time in the bottom two
 The contestant was eliminated after her second time in the bottom two
 The contestant was eliminated after her third time in the bottom two
 The contestant was eliminated in the final judging and placed fourth
 The contestant was eliminated in the final judging and placed third
 The contestant was eliminated in the final judging and placed as the runner-up

Photo shoot guide
Episode 1 photo shoot: Nude with male models
Episode 2 photo shoot: Beauty shots with sea creatures 
Episode 3 commercial: Venus razor 
Episode 4 photo shoot: Bond girl editorial 
Episode 5 photo shoot: Couture editorial on a trampolines
Episode 6 photo shoot: LG Chocolate phones in lingerie with dog
Episode 7 photo shoot: Fashion magazine covers
Episode 8 photo shoot: CoverGirl TruBlend ad

Makeovers 
Jacqueline – Rachel Hunter inspired volumized curls and dyed honey blonde
Steff – Trimmed and dyed platinum blonde
Gina – Shoulder-length bob and dyed dark brown
Mo – Cut shorter and dyed chocolate brown
Cori – Gisele Bündchen inspired blonde highlights
Tia – Long copper red extensions
Tara – Long wavy dark brown weave
Sinead – Natalie Portman inspired pixie cut
Rebecca – Bob cut, bangs trimmed, and dyed fire engine red

References

External links
Official site

2007 Canadian television seasons
Canada's Next Top Model
Television shows filmed in Toronto